Régis Gurtner (born 8 December 1986) is a French professional footballer who plays as a goalkeeper for Ligue 2 side Amiens SC.

Career statistics

References

External links
 Régis Gurtner at foot-national.com
 
 

1986 births
Living people
People from Saverne
French people of German descent
French footballers
Association football goalkeepers
FCSR Haguenau players
RC Strasbourg Alsace players
US Boulogne players
Le Havre AC players
Amiens SC players
Ligue 1 players
Ligue 2 players
Championnat National players
Footballers from Alsace
Sportspeople from Bas-Rhin